Anthony Allcock  (born 1955) is an English bowls player. Born in Leicestershire, England,  he is considered to be one of the leading bowlers of his generation and was twice world outdoor singles champion (1992 and 1996) and three times World Indoor Singles Champion (1986, 1987 and 2002).

Bowls career

World Outdoor Championships
Allcock won double gold at the 1980 World Outdoor Bowls Championship in Melbourne in the team event (Leonard Cup) and triples with Jimmy Hobday and the legendary David Bryant. Four years later he won two more medals including the gold medal in the fours with George Turley, John Bell and Julian Haines at the 1984 World Outdoor Bowls Championship in Aberdeen. After winning three more medals at the 1988 World Outdoor Bowls Championship in Auckland he went on to win two singles gold medals at successive championships. They were at the 1992 World Outdoor Bowls Championship in Worthing and the 1996 World Outdoor Bowls Championship in Adelaide. With his eleven world indoor titles he has won seventeen world titles in total.

Commonwealth Games
Allcock played in three successive Commonwealth Games in 1990, 1994 and 1998. He won singles silver medal in the 1994 Commonwealth Games in Victoria, British Columbia, Canada.

Allcock was appointed the bowls performance coach for the England team at the 2002 Commonwealth Games. He is the current Chief Executive of Bowls England.

World Indoor Championships
Allcock was also three times singles and eight times pairs champion at the World Indoor Bowls Championships. The singles wins were in 1986, 1987 and 2002 and the pairs (five with David Bryant) were in 1986, 1987, 1989, 1990 1991, 1992 (and one each with Mervyn King and David Holt) were in 1997 and 2003.

National
He has won eight National Championship titles, singles (1990, 1991), triples (1990, 1995), fours (1994) and junior singles (1975, 1977, 1981) bowling for Belgrave BC and then Cheltenham BC. He has also won the singles at the British Isles Bowls Championships in 1992.

Personal life
Allcock is now chief executive of Bowls England. Having been appointed a Member of the Order of the British Empire (MBE) in the 1989 New Year Honours for services to bowls, he was promoted to Officer of the Order of the British Empire (OBE) in the 2019 Birthday Honours for services to lawn bowls.

Publications and videos
Allcock has written several books on bowls, and released a series of instructional videos on the subject.

Books
Allcock, Tony (1987) Improve Your Bowls, HarperCollinsWillow, 
Allcock, Tony & Rhys Jones, David (1988) Bowls Skills, Golden Books, 
Allcock, Tony (1989) End to End: A Year in Bowls, Heinemann Kingswood, 
Bryant, David; Allcock, Tony  & Horton, Edward (1994) Bowl to Win, HarperCollinsWillow, 
Allcock, Tony Winning Bowls, Hutchinson,

Videos
Tony Allcock's Art of Bowls (4 volumes)

References

English male bowls players
Commonwealth Games silver medallists for England
Bowls players at the 1990 Commonwealth Games
Bowls players at the 1994 Commonwealth Games
Bowls players at the 1998 Commonwealth Games
1955 births
Living people
Sportspeople from Leicestershire
Commonwealth Games medallists in lawn bowls
Bowls World Champions
Indoor Bowls World Champions
Officers of the Order of the British Empire
Medallists at the 1994 Commonwealth Games